Kiss Me Quiet is the second extended play by Canadian country music artist Jess Moskaluke. It was released on September 25, 2015 via MDM Recordings. It include the singles "Kiss Me Quiet", "Take Me Home", and "Elevator". Kiss Me Quiet won the award for Country Album of the Year at the 2017 Juno Awards.

Track listing

Chart performance

Singles

References

2015 EPs
Jess Moskaluke EPs
MDM Recordings albums
Juno Award for Country Album of the Year albums